This is a list of famous and notable people from Uttarakhand, India.

Education and development
 Govind Ballabh Pant, recipient of Bharat Ratna India's highest civilian award, Pantnagar University on his name
 Hemwati Nandan Bahuguna, Hemwati Nandan Bahuguna Garhwal University on his name
 Kharag Singh Valdiya, Indian geologist and a former vice chancellor of Kumaon University, Padam Shri in 2007 and Padam Bhushan in 2015

Arts and culture
 Surendra Pal Joshi, artist known for paintings, sculptures and murals
 Gunanand Pathik, freedom fighter and poet
 Girish Tiwari (Girda) (1942–2010), poet and folk singer
 Meena Rana – Indian folk singer
 Narendra Singh Negi – Indian folk singer
 Chander Singh Rahi, prominent folk singer and researcher from Uttarakhand. Fondly described as the “Bhishma Pitamah of Uttarakhand folk music”
 Pritam Bhartwan – Indian folk singer
 Jubin Nautiyal, Indian singer
 Neha Kakkar, Indian singer
 Sonu Kakkar, Indian singer
 Pratyul Joshi, Indian singer

Cinema 
 Ali Abbas Zafar, film director
 Anukriti Gusain
 Anushka Sharma
 Archana Puran Singh
 Asha Negi
 Barkha Bisht
 Chitrashi Rawat
 Deepak Dobriyal
 Dev Negi
 Fahad Ali
 Hemant Pandey
 Himani Shivpuri
 Jyotsna Chandola
 Kainaat Arora
 Kulraj Randhawa
 Lavanya Tripathi
 Madhurima Tuli
 Manasvi Mamgai
 Neha Kakkar
 Niharika Singh
 Nirmal Pandey
 Prasoon Joshi
 Raghav Juyal
 Ragini Nandwani
 Richa Panai
 Roop Durgapal
 Sakshi Chaudhary
 Shilpa Saklani
 Shruti Bisht
 Sonam Bajwa
 Sonu Kakkar
 Sukirti Kandpal
 Tigmanshu Dhulia
 Tom Alter
 Udita Goswami,
 Urvashi Rautela
 Varun Badola
 Vibha Anand

Theatre 
B. M. Shah
Mohan Upreti

Defence 
 Brigadier Surendra Singh Panwar
 Lieutenant General Lakshman Singh Rawat - Former Deputy Chief of the Army Staff and father of General Bipin Rawat.
 General Bipin Rawat – 1st Chief of Defence Staff of India
 General Anil Chauhan – 2nd Chief of Defence Staff of India
 Gabar Singh Negi, Victoria Cross Garhwal Rifles 
 Lt. General M. M. Lakhera, ex-Governor of Mizoram, ex-Lieutenant Governor of Pondicherry
 Havaldar Gajender Singh, Ashoka Chakra
 Rajesh Singh Adhikari, Maha Vir Chakra
 Captain Ummed Singh Mahra, He was awarded the Ashoka Chakra, India's highest peacetime military decoration.
 General Bipin Chandra Joshi, Chief of Army Staff of Indian Army
 Admiral Devendra Kumar Joshi, Chief of Naval Staff of Indian Navy
 Major Som Nath Sharma, first recipient of Param Vir Chakra
 Lt. Col. Manabendra Shah
 Major General Bhuwan Chandra Khanduri
 Jaswant Singh Rawat, hero of Indo-China War, 1962; Mahavir Chakra
 Darwan Singh Negi, Victoria Cross from 1st Battalion of 39th Garhwal Rifles
 Ajit Kumar Doval, 5th National Security Adviser of India
 Rifleman Jaswant Singh Rawat, recipient of Maha Vir Chakra
 Naik Mohan Nath Goswami, recipient of Ashoka Chakra
 Havildar Bahadur Singh Bohra, recipient of Ashoka Chakra

Police
Mohan Chand Sharma

Literature 
 Shivprasad Dabral Charan; Hindi & Garhwali writer, historian, poet
 Manglesh Dabral, Hindi writer, poet
 Sumitranandan Pant, Hindi writer, poet
 Shekhar Pathak, Hindi writer, academic
 Shivani, Hindi writer
 Shailesh Matiyani, Hindi writer
 Manohar Shyam Joshi, writer, screenwriter
 Mrinal Pande, Hindi writer, journalist
 Ruskin Bond, English writer
 Ramachandra Guha, writer, historian
 Girish Tiwari (Girda), writer, poet

Politics 
 Govind Ballabh Pant
 Hemwati Nandan Bahuguna
 Murli Manohar Joshi
 Mala Raj Laxmi Shah
 Mohan Singh Bisht
 Harish Rawat
 K.C. Pant
 N.D. Tiwari
 Bhuvan Chandra Khanduri
 Ram Prasad Nautiyal
 Trivendra Singh Rawat
 Harak Singh Rawat

Chief Ministers
Nityanand Swami
Bhagat Singh Koshyari
Narayan Dutt Tiwari
Bhuwan Chandra Khanduri
Ramesh Pokhriyal
Vijay Bahuguna
Harish Rawat

Sports

 Abhinav Bindra, shooter; won Olympic gold in the 10 m air rifle event in 2008
 Bachendri Pal, mountaineer; in 1984 became the first Indian woman to reach the summit of Mount Everest
 Chandraprabha Aitwal, mountaineer
 Ekta Bisht, first international cricketer from Uttarakhand
 Major Harsh Vardhan Bahuguna, mountaineer; died in the international expedition to the Mount Everest on 18 April 1971 
 Hemlata Kala,  cricketer
 Jaspal Rana, shooter
 Labhanshu Sharma, wrestler
 Madhumita Bisht, badminton player
 Mahendra Singh Dhoni, cricketer
 Manish Pandey, cricketer
 Nain Singh Rawat, Asian explorer
 Unmukt Chand, cricketer
 Pawan Suyal, cricketer
 Parimarjan Negi 
 Mir Ranjan Negi
 Navjit Singh, volleyball player
 Arvind Raturi, youngest mountaineer of Uttarakhand to scale Mount Everest on 19 May 2013
 Jagdish Singh, Winter Olympian

Law and Justice 

 Prafulla Chandra Pant: Former Judge, Supreme Court of India

 Sudhanshu Dhulia: Judge, Supreme Court of India

Others 
 Pooran Chand Joshi, Professor of Social Anthropology, University of Delhi  
 Prof. (Dr.) Prem Lal Joshi, academic professor, author 
 Sundarlal Bahuguna, Chipko movement leader
 Vandana Shiva, environmentalist
 Yashodhar Mathpal, archaeologist, painter, curator, and rock art conservationist, recipient of the Padma Shri
 Anurag Chauhan, social worker

References

Uttarakhand
 
People